Luka Nižetić (born 12 August 1983) is a Croatian singer. His debut album Premijera was recorded in 2006. He is best known for his hits "Ponekad poželim" ("Sometimes I wish") and "Proljeće" ("Springtime").

Biography
Luka Nižetić was born in Split, Croatia, as the second child of Tamara and Milo Nižetić. Together with his sister Petra, he grew up in Mertojak, part of Split. His parents noticed Luka's great interest in music at a young age. Consequently, they sent him to nuns for his early music education. A nun, called Cecilia, taught Luka to play the piano. When he was about 11 years old, music professor Mišo Linić started giving Luka lessons in singing and gave him basic knowledge in composing. The opera diva Sanja Erceg–Vrekalo taught him in singing technique. When Luka was about seventeen years old, he composed his first song "Ludi grad" (Oh Crazy Town). 
The composer Zdenko Runjić included this song in his music festival MHJ 2001. To everybody's surprise, the young singer won three Silver Seagulls as 2nd prize by the expert jury.

2004 was a stellar year for Nižetić. He signed a contract with Menart Records, and published his first album Premijera which included the singles "Ne krivi me" (Don't Blame Me), "Tebi pjevam" (I'm singing to you), "Ponekad poželim" (Sometimes I wish), "Proljeće" (Springtime) and "Meni trebaš ti" (I need you).
After his second performance in the song competition Dora in 2005, where he presented his own song "Proljeće" (Springtime), Luka Nižetić became a well known music personality in Croatia. There followed his nomination for the discographic prize Porin (Croatian equivalent of Grammy) in the category [debutant of the year] as well as a performance in Osijek. Later, Luka reached success in the Croatian Radio Festival in 2006 singing together with Lana Jurčević the hit song "Prava ljubav" (True love); it soon reached the top of almost all Croatian music lists.

In Light Music Festival, Split 2006, he presented the song "More" (The Sea) for which he won the Golden Sail.  After the first final evening of the festival, the audience placed him first and in the superfinale, the audience placed him third overall.

On February 16, 2019, Nižetić took part in Dora 2019, the Croatian preselection for the Eurovision Song Contest 2019, with the song “Brutalero”, written by Branimir Mihaljević. He performed eighth and finished third with 13 out of 24 available points, placing behind winner Roko Blažević and runner-up Lorena Bućan.

Discography

 Premijera (2005)
 Slobodno dišem (2007)
 Na tren i zavijek (2008)
 Kad zasvira... (2012)
 Ljubav je mukte (2018)
 Ludilo brale (2022)

Filmography
Zvjezdice - since 2014.

References

External links
 Official website 
 Official blog 

 

1983 births
Living people
Croatian pop singers
Musicians from Split, Croatia
Hayat Production artists
21st-century Croatian male singers